Yahya Sunbul (born 7 January 1998) is a Saudi Arabian professional footballer who plays as a midfielder for Pro League side Al-Raed.

Club career
Sunbul started his career at the youth teams of Al-Ittihad and was called up to the first team in 2018. He left the club in the same year he was called up after failing to make an appearance for the senior team. At the beginning of 2019, he joined Al-Nojoom until the end of the season. On 24 July 2019, Sunbul joined Hetten on a one-year contract. He made 23 appearances and scored twice before leaving following Hetten's relegation to the Saudi Second Division. On 13 October 2020, Sunbul joined Jeddah. On 26 August 2021, Sunbul joined Pro League side Al-Raed.

References

External links
 

1998 births
Living people
Association football midfielders
Saudi Arabian footballers
Ittihad FC players
Al-Nojoom FC players
Hetten FC players
Jeddah Club players
Al-Raed FC players
Saudi First Division League players
Saudi Professional League players